

Incumbents
 President: 
 Park Geun-hye (Powers and duties suspended as of December 9, 2016), 
 Hwang Kyo-ahn (Acting President as of December 9, 2016)
 Prime Minister: Hwang Kyo-ahn

Events

March
March 11–15 - 2016 World Short Track Speed Skating Championships in Seoul

April
April 13 - 2016 South Korean legislative election

September
September 27-October 2 - 2016 Korea Open Superseries in Seoul

November
 November 1 - Choi Soon-sil, the woman at the center of the South Korean political scandal involving President Park Geun-hye, is detained for questioning.
November 12 - In Seoul, a big protest occurs due to the Choi Soon-sil's political scandal, and the corruption of Park Geun-hye.

December
 December 9 - South Korean lawmakers impeach President Park Geun-hye by a 234–56 vote. Prime Minister Hwang Kyo-ahn, a staunch defender of Ms. Park, will serve as acting president. South Korea's Constitutional Court has up to 180 days to render a final decision.

See also
2016 in South Korean television
List of South Korean films of 2016
2016 in South Korean music
2016 in South Korean football
Years in South Korea

References

 
2010s in South Korea
Years of the 21st century in South Korea
South Korea
South Korea